Samyuktha is a 1988 Indian Kannada-language thriller film.

Samyuktha may also refer to:

People 
 Samyukta or Sanyogita, purported wife of medieval Indian king Prithviraj Chauhan, daughter of king Jaichand of Kannauj
 Samyuktha (actress, born 1995), Indian actress
 Samyuktha Hegde (born 1998), Indian Kannada and Tamil film actress
 Samyuktha Varma (born 1979), Indian actress

Other 
 Rani Samyuktha, a 1962 Indian Tamil-language historical romance film about queen Samyukta and king Prithviraj Chauhan 
 Urs Samyuktha Paksha, a political party in the Indian state of Karnataka

See also